The Writers Guild of America Award for Television: Dramatic Series is an award presented by the Writers Guild of America to the writers of the best dramatic television series of the season. It has been awarded since the 58th Annual Writers Guild of America Awards in 2006. The year indicates when each season aired. The winners are highlighted in gold.

Winners and nominees

2000s

2010s

2020s

Total awards by network
 AMC – 7
 HBO – 5
 FX – 2
 ABC – 1
 Hulu – 1
 Netflix - 1

Total nominations by network
 HBO – 23
 AMC – 19
 Netflix - 10
 Showtime - 9
 ABC – 6
 FX – 4
 The 101 Network - 3
 CBS - 3
 Hulu – 4
 Disney+ - 3
 NBC - 2
Apple TV+ - 2
 Fox - 1
 Prime Video - 1
 USA - 1

Programs with multiple awards
4 awards
Mad Men (AMC)

3 awards
Breaking Bad (AMC)

2 awards
The Americans (FX)
Succession (HBO)

Programs with multiple nominations

8 nominations
Mad Men (AMC)

6 nominations
Better Call Saul (AMC)
Game of Thrones (HBO)

5 nominations
Breaking Bad (AMC)

4 nominations
The Americans (FX)
The Crown (Netflix)
Dexter (Showtime)
Friday Night Lights (NBC), (The 101 Network)
The Handmaid's Tale (Hulu)
Lost (ABC)

3 nominations
Boardwalk Empire (HBO)
The Good Wife (CBS)
Homeland (Showtime)
Succession (HBO)

2 nominations
Deadwood (HBO)
Grey's Anatomy (ABC)
House of Cards (Netflix)
The Sopranos (HBO)
Stranger Things (Netflix)
The Wire (HBO)
Yellowjackets (Showtime)

References

Screenplay